The arrondissement of Forcalquier is an arrondissement of France in the Alpes-de-Haute-Provence department in the Provence-Alpes-Côte d'Azur region. It has 97 communes.

Composition

The communes of the arrondissement of Forcalquier, and their INSEE codes, are:

 Allemagne-en-Provence (04004)
 Aubenas-les-Alpes (04012)
 Aubignosc (04013)
 Authon (04016)
 Banon (04018)
 Bayons (04023)
 Bellaffaire (04026)
 Bevons (04027)
 La Brillanne (04034)
 Brunet (04035)
 Le Caire (04037)
 Le Castellet (04041)
 Céreste (04045)
 Châteaufort (04050)
 Châteauneuf-Miravail (04051)
 Châteauneuf-Val-Saint-Donat (04053)
 Clamensane (04057)
 Claret (04058)
 Corbières-en-Provence (04063)
 Cruis (04065)
 Curbans (04066)
 Curel (04067)
 Dauphin (04068)
 Entrepierres (04075)
 Entrevennes (04077)
 Esparron-de-Verdon (04081)
 Faucon-du-Caire (04085)
 Fontienne (04087)
 Forcalquier (04088)
 Gigors (04093)
 Gréoux-les-Bains (04094)
 L'Hospitalet (04095)
 Lardiers (04101)
 Limans (04104)
 Lurs (04106)
 Mane (04111)
 Manosque (04112)
 Melve (04118)
 Mison (04123)
 Montagnac-Montpezat (04124)
 Montfort (04127)
 Montfuron (04128)
 Montjustin (04129)
 Montlaux (04130)
 Montsalier (04132)
 La Motte-du-Caire (04134)
 Nibles (04137)
 Niozelles (04138)
 Noyers-sur-Jabron (04139)
 Les Omergues (04140)
 Ongles (04141)
 Oppedette (04142)
 Oraison (04143)
 Peipin (04145)
 Piégut (04150)
 Pierrerue (04151)
 Pierrevert (04152)
 Puimichel (04156)
 Puimoisson (04157)
 Quinson (04158)
 Redortiers (04159)
 Reillanne (04160)
 Revest-des-Brousses (04162)
 Revest-du-Bion (04163)
 Revest-Saint-Martin (04164)
 Riez (04166)
 La Rochegiron (04169)
 Roumoules (04172)
 Sainte-Croix-à-Lauze (04175)
 Saint-Étienne-les-Orgues (04178)
 Sainte-Tulle (04197)
 Saint-Geniez (04179)
 Saint-Laurent-du-Verdon (04186)
 Saint-Maime (04188)
 Saint-Martin-de-Brômes (04189)
 Saint-Martin-les-Eaux (04190)
 Saint-Michel-l'Observatoire (04192)
 Saint-Vincent-sur-Jabron (04199)
 Salignac (04200)
 Saumane (04201)
 Sigonce (04206)
 Sigoyer (04207)
 Simiane-la-Rotonde (04208)
 Sisteron (04209)
 Sourribes (04211)
 Thèze (04216)
 Turriers (04222)
 Vachères (04227)
 Valavoire (04228)
 Valbelle (04229)
 Valensole (04230)
 Valernes (04231)
 Vaumeilh (04233)
 Venterol (04234)
 Villemus (04241)
 Villeneuve (04242)
 Volx (04245)

History

The arrondissement of Forcalquier was created in 1800. At the January 2017 reorganization of the arrondissements of Alpes-de-Haute-Provence, it gained 16 communes from the arrondissement of Digne-les-Bains, and it lost six communes to the arrondissement of Digne-les-Bains.

As a result of the reorganisation of the cantons of France which came into effect in 2015, the borders of the cantons are no longer related to the borders of the arrondissements. The cantons of the arrondissement of Forcalquier were, as of January 2015:

 Banon
 Forcalquier
 Manosque-Nord
 Manosque-Sud-Est
 Manosque-Sud-Ouest
 La Motte-du-Caire
 Noyers-sur-Jabron
 Peyruis
 Reillanne
 Saint-Étienne-les-Orgues
 Sisteron
 Turriers
 Volonne

References

Forcalquier